Forlorn Sunset is a novel by the British writer Michael Sadleir which was first published in 1947. Like his better known work Fanny by Gaslight the novel is set in Victorian London and explores the underworld of Vice that existed in the city.

Bibliography
 Neuburg, Victor E. The Popular Press Companion to Popular Literature. Bowling Green State University Press, 1983.

1947 British novels
Novels set in London
Constable & Co. books